Jelin may refer to:
 Jelin-e Olya
 Jelin-e Sofla